Orlando Vela Flores (born 5 September 1994, in Veracruz, Mexico) is a Mexican footballer who plays midfielder, and at present is a member of the club Tigers UANL Premier of the Second Division of Mexico.

Career 
Vela debuted at Copa MX on 18 February 2014 against Correcaminos.

Clubs

External links 
 Index card of Orlando Vela in Fichajes.com
 Index card of Orlando Vela in http://www.ligamx.net/

Mexican footballers
Tigres UANL footballers
1994 births
Living people
People from Veracruz (city)
Association football midfielders